The Nokia Lumia 810 is a Windows Phone smartphone made by Nokia exclusively for wireless carrier T-Mobile US. It was announced on October 8, 2012. The device runs the then-new Windows Phone 8 operating system (despite being numbered in the x10 series which is used for Windows Phone 7) and features a 4.3-inch AMOLED WVGA ClearBlack display, an 8-megapixel rear-facing camera, a 1.5 GHz Snapdragon processor, exchangeable shells (cyan and black) and supports Qi inductive charging when equipped with a specific shell. It supports T-Mobile's 4G network.

The phone includes an enhanced Nokia Drive package with voice-guided turn-by-turn navigation, and Nokia Transit, which allows navigation through local public transportation. Nokia City Lens offers a hybrid mapping/photography feature that overlays various points of interest in an image, such as businesses. Additional photography-related features are Nokia Cinemagraph, which is "a lens that creates animated GIFs"; panorama settings, and Group Shot. The phone includes a dedicated camera button that allows activating the camera from a sleeping or even locked device. The October 8 announcement included Nokia Music, which can also be used offline.

The Lumia 810 was discontinued in stores in April 2013. As of April 4, 2014, the day Microsoft introduced its Windows Phone 8.1 OS update, T-Mobile US stated that "no updates" for the 810 will be made available.  In February 2015, T-Mobile confirmed that Windows Phone 8.1 would not come to devices other than the Lumia 521 and Lumia 925.

Windows Phone 8.1 was not released for the phone, making the Lumia 810 the only Nokia Windows phone to not be updated to Windows Phone 8.1. However, it's possible to install Windows Phone 8.1 on the Lumia 810 through Microsoft's Preview for Developers app.

See also 
 Microsoft Lumia

References

External links
 
 Nokia developer - specifications

Microsoft Lumia
Windows Phone devices
Mobile phones introduced in 2012
Discontinued smartphones
Videotelephony
Nokia smartphones